The Sasabe, Arizona Port of Entry has been in existence since 1916, and was substantially renovated during the early 1990s. During the renovation, the historic 1930s-era border station, which was listed on the U.S. National Register of Historic Places in 2014, was preserved as office space.  Sasabe is the least-trafficked crossing in Arizona.

See also

 List of Mexico–United States border crossings
 List of Canada–United States border crossings

References

Mexico–United States border crossings
Geography of Pima County, Arizona
Government of Pima County, Arizona
Buildings and structures in Pima County, Arizona
National Register of Historic Places in Pima County, Arizona
Government buildings on the National Register of Historic Places in Arizona
1916 establishments in Arizona
Transport infrastructure completed in 1916